John Halkerston was a Scottish architect, prominent in the 15th century. He was Master of Works at Trinity College Kirk, Edinburgh, in the 1460s. Around the same time, he worked on St John's Kirk, in Perth, whose northwest porch is now named "Halkerston Tower" in his honour. The door of the tower is known as the "Bride's Entrance" due to its use during weddings today.

Halkerston's Wynd, a section of the Edinburgh town walls, is named for him.

References

15th-century Scottish architects